Irfanullah Khan Marwat (born 1950) is a Pakistani politician. He has served as a member of the Provincial Assembly of Sindh  and has been appointed as a Provincial Minister in Sindh, Pakistan several times. Irfanullah Khan Marwat has held numerous portfolios in the Sindh Government since 1989 including transport, health, home, education and mines and mineral.

He is one of the sons-in-law of former President of Pakistan Ghulam Ishaq Khan and rose to prominence in the early 90s under the Chief Ministership of Jam Sadiq Ali. Irfan Marwat is a graduate of Institute of Business Administration (IBA) Karachi and is well known among the political circles of Pakistan. Irfanullah Khan Marwat was elected again as a member of the Provincial Assembly of Sindh on 11 May 2013. He has a large voter base in the city of Karachi and is a popular and well known politician in Pakistan. Irfanullah Khan Marwat, is member of Pakistan Muslim League (N) and elected from PS-114.

See also
 Bannu

References

Bibliography
 www.khyber.org retrieved 10 June 2013

Pashtun people
Living people
1950 births
Institute of Business Administration, Karachi alumni
Politicians from Karachi